The  is a Japanese Samurai kin group or clan.

Ancestors
 Emperor Jimmu
 Emperor Suizei
 Emperor Annei
 Emperor Itoku
 Emperor Kōshō
 Emperor Kōan
 Emperor Kōrei
 Emperor Kōgen
 Emperor Kaika
 Emperor Sujin
 Emperor Suinin
 Emperor Keikō
 Yamato Takeru
 Emperor Chūai
 Emperor Ōjin
 Wakanuke Futamata no Kimi
 Ohohoto no Kimi
 Ohi no Kimi
 Ushi no Kimi
 Emperor Keitai
 Emperor Kinmei
 Emperor Bidatsu
 Prince Oshisaka
 Emperor Jomei
 Emperor Tenji
 Prince Shiki
 Emperor Kōnin
 Emperor Kanmu
 Emperor Saga
 Emperor Ninmyō
 Emperor Montoku
 Emperor Seiwa
 Prince Sadazumi
 Minamoto no Tsunemoto
 Minamoto no Mitsunaka
 Minamoto no Yorinobu
 Minamoto no Yoriyoshi
 Minamoto no Yoshiie
 Minamoto no Yoshikuni
 Minamoto no Yoshiyasu
 (Ashikaga) Minamoto no Yoshikiyo
 (Hirosawa) Ashikaga Yoshizane
 (Ashikaga) Hosokawa Yoshisue

History

The clan was descended from the Seiwa Genji, a branch of the Minamoto clan, and ultimately from Emperor Seiwa himself, through the Ashikaga clan. It produced many prominent officials in the Ashikaga shogunate's administration. In the Edo period, the Hosokawa clan was one of the largest landholding daimyō families in Japan. In the present day, the current clan head Morihiro Hosokawa, has served as Prime Minister of Japan.

Muromachi and Sengoku eras
Ashikaga Yoshisue, son of Ashikaga Yoshizane, was the first to take the name of Hosokawa. Hosokawa Yoriharu, a Hosokawa of the late Kamakura period, fought for the Ashikaga clan against the Kamakura shogunate. Another, Hosokawa Akiuji, helped establish the Ashikaga shogunate.

The clan wielded significant power over the course of the Muromachi (1336–1467), Sengoku (1467–1600), and Edo periods, moving, however, from Shikoku, to Kinai, and then to Kyūshū over the centuries.

The clan was also one of three families to dominate the post of Kanrei (Shōgun's deputy), under the Ashikaga shogunate. One such individual was Hosokawa Yoriyuki. At the beginning of the Ashikaga's rule, the Hosokawa were given control of the entirety of Shikoku. Over the course of this period, members of the Hosokawa clan were Constables (shugo) of Awa, Awaji, Bitchū, Izumi, Sanuki, Settsu, Tanba, Tosa, and Yamashiro Provinces.

A conflict between Hosokawa Katsumoto, the fifth Kanrei, and his father-in-law Yamana Sōzen, over the shogunate's succession, sparked the Ōnin War, which led to the fall of the shogunate and a period of 150 years of chaos and war, known as the Sengoku period. Following the fall of the Ashikaga shogunate, which was based in Kyoto, control of the city, and thus ostensibly the country, fell into the hands of the Hosokawa clan (who held the post of Kyoto Kanrei – Shōgun's deputy in Kyoto) for a few generations.

Katsumoto's son, Hosokawa Masamoto, held power in this way at the end of the 15th century, but was assassinated in 1507. After his death, the clan became divided and was weakened by internecine fighting. What power they still had, however, was centered in and around Kyoto. This gave them the leverage to consolidate their power to some extent, and came to be strong rivals with the Ōuchi clan, both politically, and in terms of dominating trade with China. The Hosokawa remained in Kyoto for roughly one hundred years, fleeing the city when it was attacked by Oda Nobunaga. Another division of the clan whom many believed became extinct is the Saikyū clan (細九氏).

Edo period

The Hosokawa of Kokura (later Kumamoto) became the "main" line of the Hosokawa clan during the Edo period. Hosokawa Gracia, the wife of Hosokawa Tadaoki, was one of the most famous samurai converts to Christianity; she was also the daughter of Akechi Mitsuhide.

The Hosokawa sided with Tokugawa Ieyasu against Ishida Mitsunari during the decisive Sekigahara Campaign, and thus were made fudai (inside) daimyō under the Tokugawa shogunate. They were given Higo Province, with an income of 540,000 koku, as their han (fief).

Hosokawa Tadatoshi, the third lord of Kumamoto, was the patron of the artist and swordsman Miyamoto Musashi.Though the Hosokawa domain was far from the capital, on Kyūshū, they were among the wealthiest of the daimyōs. By 1750, Higo was one of the top producers of rice, and was in fact counted as a standard by the Osaka rice brokers. The domain suffered from serious economic decline after that, as most domains did, but the sixth lord, Hosokawa Shigekata (1718–1785, r. 1747–1785) instituted a number of reforms which turned the situation around. He also founded a Han school, Jishūkan, in 1755.
In later years, it produced many scholars such as Yokoi Shōnan.

In 1787, the main family line descended from Tadatoshi became extinct with the death of the 7th lord, Shigekata's son Harutoshi (1758–1787; r. 1785–1787). He was succeeded by his distant cousin Narishige, the sixth Lord of Udo (1755–c1835, r. 1787–1810) a direct descendant of Tadatoshi's younger brother Yukitaka (1615–1645). In 1810, Narishige abdicated his title in favor of his elder son Naritatsu (1788–1826, r. 1810–1826), who succeeded as the ninth lord of Kumamoto. Naritatsu died without an heir in 1826, and was succeeded by his nephew Narimori (1804–1860, r. 1826–1860), the son of Naritatsu's younger brother Tatsuyuki (1784–1818), who was the seventh lord of Udo.

Following the death of Narimori in 1860, his elder son Yoshikuni (1835–1876, r. 1860–1871) succeeded him as the eleventh and final ruling lord of Kumamoto.

There were four major branches of the Hosokawa clan in the Edo period, each of which held the title of daimyō. Another two branches of the family, under the Nagaoka surname, served the Hosokawa of Kumamoto as karō. The residence of one of those families, is still extant, and is a Tangible Cultural Property of Kumamoto Prefecture.

Boshin War
During the Boshin War of 1868–69, the Hosokawa of Kumamoto, Kumamoto-Shinden, and Udo sided with the imperial government. Its forces took part in the Battle of Aizu and the Battle of Hakodate, among others.

Meiji and beyond
Following the abolition of the feudal class in 1871, the Hosokawa clan and its branches were made part of the new nobility in the Meiji era. The head of the main family line (Kumamoto) was given the hereditary title of marquis (kōshaku), while the heads of the secondary branches became viscounts (shishaku); the titles became obsolete in 1947. The present head of the main family line, Morihiro Hosokawa, former Prime Minister of Japan, is a descendant of the Hosokawa of Kumamoto.

Key Genealogies

Main Branch
 Hosokawa Yoshisue
 Hosokawa Akiuji (adopted)
 Hosokawa Kimiyori
 Hosokawa Kazuuji (1296–1342)
 Hosokawa Kiyouji (d.1362)
 Hosokawa Yoriyuki
 Hosokawa Yorimoto (1343–1397)
 Hosokawa Mitsumoto (1378–1426)
 Hosokawa Mochimoto (1399–1429)
 Hosokawa Mochiyuki (1400–1442)
 Hosokawa Katsumoto
 Hosokawa Masamoto
 Hosokawa Sumiyuki (1489–1507)
 Hosokawa Sumimoto
 Hosokawa Takakuni
 Hosokawa Tanekuni (1508–1525)
 Hosokawa Harumoto
 Hosokawa Ujitsuna (1514–1564)
 Hosokawa Akimoto (1548–1615)
 Hosokawa Motokatsu (1561–1628)
 Hosokawa Yoshimoto

Kumamoto (Became Main Branch)

 Hosokawa Fujitaka
 Hosokawa Tadaoki
 Hosokawa Tadatoshi
 Hosokawa Mitsunao
 Hosokawa Tsunatoshi (1643–1714)
 Hosokawa Nobunori (1676–1732)
 Hosokawa Munetaka (1716–1747)
 Hosokawa Shigekata
 Hosokawa Harutoshi (1758–1787)
 Hosokawa Narishige (1755–1835)
 Hosokawa Naritatsu (1797–1826)
 Hosokawa Narimori (1804–1860)
 Hosokawa Yoshikuni (1835–1876) – Last ruling Lord of Kumamoto
 Hosokawa Morihisa, 1st Marquis (1839–1893) (created 1884)
 Hosokawa Morishige, 2nd Marquis (1868–1914)
 Hosokawa Moritatsu, 3rd Marquis (title made obsolete in 1947) (1883–1970)
 Hosokawa Morisada, titular 5th Marquis (1912–2005)
 Morihiro Hosokawa, titular 6th Marquis (born 1938)
 Morimitsu Hosokawa, heir (born 1972)

Branches
Kumamoto-Shinden (Takase)

Hosokawa Toshishige (1647–1687)
Hosokawa Toshimasa (1672–1715)
Hosokawa Toshiyasu (1701–1749)
Hosokawa Toshihiro (1716–1767)
Hosokawa Toshiyuki (1750–1781)

Hosokawa Toshitsune (1754–1805)
Hosokawa Toshikuni (1784–1810)
Hosokawa Toshichika (1788–1844)
Hosokawa Toshimochi (1808–1864)
Hosokawa Toshinaga (1829–1901)

Hosokawa Toshisuke
Hosokawa Teruko (1937–)
Hosokawa Kendi (1960–)
Hosokawa Sachiko (1990–)

Udo

Hosokawa Yukitaka (1637-1690)
Hosokawa Aritaka (1676–1733)
Hosokawa Okinari (1699–1737)
Hosokawa Okisato (1722–1745)
Hosokawa Okinori (1723–1785)

Hosokawa Tatsuhiro (1755–1835)
Hosokawa Tatsuyuki (1784–1818)
Hosokawa Tatsumasa (1804–1860)
Hosokawa Yukika (1811–1876)
Hosokawa Tatsunori (1832–1888)

Hosokawa Yukizane (1842–1902)

Hitachi-Yatabe

Hosokawa Okimoto (1564–1619)
Hosokawa Okimasa (1604–1643)
Hosokawa Okitaka (1632–1690)
Hosokawa Okinaga (1658–1737)
Hosokawa Okizane (1687–1728)

Hosokawa Okitora (1710–1737)
Hosokawa Okiharu (1737–1794)
Hosokawa Okinori (1759–1837)
Hosokawa Okitatsu (1798–1855)
Hosokawa Okitsura (1832–1907)

Hosokawa Okitsugu
Hosokawa Okiharu

See also
Matsui Okinaga
Miyamoto Musashi
Kumamoto Castle
History of Kumamoto Prefecture
Tōrin-in, former family temple

Notes

Further reading
Bodiford, William (1993). Sōtō Zen in Medieval Japan. Honolulu: University of Hawaii Press.
Bingham, Woodbridge (1964). A History of Asia. New York: Allyn and Bacon.
Motoyama, Yukihiko (1997). Proliferating Talent. Honolulu: University of Hawai'i Press.
Sansom, George (1961). A History of Japan: 1334-1615. Stanford, California: Stanford University Press.
Sansom, George (1963). A History of Japan: 1615-1867. Stanford, California: Stanford University Press.
Wilson, William S. (2004). The Lone Samurai: The Life of Miyamoto Musashi. New York: Kodansha International.

 
Japanese clans
History of Kumamoto Prefecture
Ashikaga clan